Middlesex Rugby is the governing body for rugby union in Middlesex, England; Middlesex is a historic county of England that covers areas in the ceremonial counties of Greater London, Surrey and Hertfordshire. The historic county is still in use when referring to sport, and some businesses in the area.  Middlesex RFU was originally created as the Middlesex County Rugby Club but within six years was being referred to as the Middlesex County Rugby Football Union and is now known simply as Middlesex Rugby.

History
FR Adams Esq of Richmond F.C. called a meeting at the Bedford Hotel at which a resolution was passed bringing the club into being.  He served as the Club and Union's first president until 1883 being succeeded by E. Temple Gurdon (also of Richmond F.C.).

Middlesex Sevens
The world-famous Middlesex Sevens were organised by Dr. Russell-Cargill and the Middlesex Hon. Secretary CS Bongard, the first tournament taking place according to one source in 1925 and others in 1926.  This was the first seven-a-side rugby festival in England.  The first tournament took place at Twickenham in aid of Middlesex hospital was won by Harlequins.

Union officials

Past Presidents

Asterisk denotes President of the R.F.U.
Two asterisks denotes member of the International Rugby Board

Honorary Secretaries

Honorary Treasurers

Members who were Presidents of the RFU

County side

Middlesex County Rugby Union was originally created as a rugby club and as such fulfilled fixtures for six years before becoming the Union for clubs within the county.  After becoming a union the club continued to operate selecting players from its constituent clubs to play representative matches for the county and to go on tours.

Very early in its history, Middlesex played Surrey under floodlights at the Old Deer Park. This is possibly the first rugby match played under floodlights as electric light had only just been invented.  A floodlit game was the ideal opportunity to try out the new technology although the game was not a great success by all accounts.

On 24 October 1905, Middlesex played the touring South African side at Richmond for their ninth match.  The Springboks won 9 – 0, their narrowest score so far in the tour; a penalty by Douglas Morkel and try by Brink made the half time score 6 – 0 whilst in the second half the only points came from a try by Loubser.  Middlesex fielded a cosmopolitan team including Jim Louwrens the South African College scrum half of 1901, three Welshmen who were also later to play for Wales (Harding, Jenkins & Williams) and the Scottish international Geddes.  The match referee was Cartwright.

On 2 September 1964 Staines RFC played a Middlesex XV on the occasion of the opening of their new ground, "The Reeves".

English County championship

1968 tour of East Africa
Middlesex were the English county champions for the sixth time in 1968, having defeated Warwickshire in the final (tries by Brian Stoneman and Sandy Hinshelwood helped them to their 9–6 win at Twickenham). At least ten of the players that had participated in the final went on the tour in July of that year. Middlesex played a total of seven matches on a tour that lasted a little over two weeks, two games being played in Uganda and five in Kenya. The tourists won all seven matches comfortably and reported that the standard of rugby in the region had dropped noticeably since some members of the touring party had last played there.  It was generally felt that the East African sides lacked stamina and tactical nous; the latter is understandable as the opportunities for playing high level rugby in the region were limited, though the former is surprising as much of the region is at altitude and it would be expected that the visitors would suffer more than the hosts.

The Middlesex tour party consisted of 70 members though the minority of these were players, the majority were officials and non-playing members who were travelling as supporters. Amongst the players, at least three had previously toured East Africa; Patrick Orr (twice, with Anti-Assassins in 1965 and Richmond F. C. in 1963), Chris Ralston (with Richmond F. C. in 1963) and Brian Stoneman (twice, with Richmond F. C. and Combined (Oxford and Cambridge) Universities, both in 1963).

Middlesex scored 262 points in seven matches, an average of more than 37 per game.  In total they conceded only 14 points.  They scored 61 tries, 32 conversions, three penalty-goals and two dropped-goals.  Top scorer was Gordon MacDonald (45 points, all from goal-kicking), Ricky Parsons was second highest scorer (33 points, from 5 tries, the rest from goal-kicking), Mike Alder was third (31 points from 6 tries, the rest from goal-kicking).  Top try scorers were Tim Rutter and Robin Jolliffe (7 each), Mike Alder and Roger Weaver (6 each).  Francis Mann was the outstanding player of the tour.

The tour had been organised by the Middlesex Hon. Secretary Barry Boyden, his assistant Cyril Brandon and the RFUEA's appointed Tour Chairman Bernard Nicholls.  As with all rugby tours to East Africa in the 1950s, 1960s and 1970s, it would not have been possible without the hosting arrangements offered by the rugby fraternity in Kenya and Uganda; in order to cut down on costs, members of the tour party were welcomed into the homes of the hosts and provided for in a manner that was acclaimed by those that were lucky enough to have toured the region. Hence the frequency with which first time tourists rapidly made certain they returned a second or third time.

Notable players

These players have played test rugby.

 John Dawes (London Welsh RFC, Lions and Barbarian F.C.)
 Sandy Hinshelwood (London Scottish,  and Lions)
 Ian Conin Jones (London Welsh RFC and  )
 George James Hamish Keith (Wasps FC and  )
 Andy Ripley (Rosslyn Park F.C., Lions and Barbarian F.C.)
 Chris Ralston (Rosslyn Park F.C.,   and Lions)
 Arthur Gould (London Welsh RFC Richmond F.C. and  )
 Peter Kininmonth
 CEL "Curly" Hammond (for four successive years was captain of Harlequin F.C. and Middlesex and later captained )
 Patrick C.R. Orr (Harlequin F.C. and Barbarian F.C.)
 Brian Stoneman (Richmond F.C. and Barbarian F.C.)
 Charles Webster Thorburn (Guy's Hospital RFC and Barbarian F.C.)
 Thomas Lawther (Old Millhillians)

Affiliated clubs
There are currently 88 clubs affiliated with the Middlesex RFU, most of which have teams at both senior and junior level.  All these clubs are based in Greater London – in what used to be the historic county of Middlesex, although a large number of clubs are also members of the Surrey RFU.

Askeans
Barnes
Barnet Elizabethans
Battersea Ironsides
Bec Old Boys
Bedfont Sports
Belsize Park
Birkbeck Phantoms
Blackheath
Bulldogs
Chiswick
Croydon
CS Rugby 1863
Ealing Trailfinders
Effingham & Leatherhead
Enfield Ignatians
Epping Upper Clapton
Feltham
Feltham Phoenix
Finchley
Finsbury Park
Footscray
Grasshoppers
Hackney
Hammersmith & Fulham
Hampstead
Hanwell
Haringey Rhinos
Harlequin Amateurs
Harlequin Ladies
Harlequins
Harrow
Hayes
Hendon
Hillingdon Abbots
Kilburn Cosmos
London Cornish
London Exiles
London Irish
London Irish Wild Geese
London New Zealand
London Nigerian
London Scottish Lions RFC
London Scottish
London Welsh Amateur
Merton
Mill Hill
Millfield Old Boys
Millwall
Mitcham
Northolt
Old Actonians
Old Alleynians 
Old Cliftonians
Old Colfeians
Old Dunstonians
Old Emanuel
Old Grammarians
Old Haberdashers
Old Haileyburians
Old Hamptonians 
Old Isleworthians
Old Millhillians
Old Pauline
Old Priorians
Old Streetonians
Old Tiffinians
Old Tottonians
Old Whitgiftian
Old Wimbledonians
Pinner & Grammarians
Quintin
Rosslyn Park
Ruislip
Saracens
Saracens Amateur
Southgate
Southwark Lancers
Staines
Streatham-Croydon
Teddington
Thamesians
Twickenham
Uxbridge
Warlingham
Wasps Amateurs
West London
Whitton Lions
Wimbledon

County club competitions 

The Middlesex RFU currently helps run the following competitions for clubs based in the historic county of Middlesex (now part of London):

Leagues
Herts/Middlesex 1 – (alongside Hertfordshire RFU) league at tier 9 of the English rugby union system 
Herts/Middlesex 2 – league at tier 10

Cups
Middlesex Senior Cup – founded in 1971, currently open to clubs at tiers 6–7 of the English rugby union system
Middlesex Bowl – founded in 2003, clubs at tiers 6–9
Middlesex Vase – founded in 2002, clubs at tiers 9–10
North West Floodlight Cup

Discontinued competitions
Herts/Middlesex 3 – tier 11 league, discontinued in 2014
Herts/Middlesex 4 – tier 12 league, discontinued in 2010
Herts/Middlesex 5 – tier 13 league, discontinued in 1997
Middlesex 1 – tier 8–10 league, discontinued in 1996
Middlesex 2 – tier 9–11 league, discontinued in 1996
Middlesex 3 – tier 10–12 league, discontinued in 1996
Middlesex 4 – tier 11–13 league, discontinued in 1996
Middlesex 5 – tier 12 league, discontinued in 1992

Notes

See also
London & SE Division
English rugby union system

Within Wikipedia
 Middlesex County Cricket Club

Photos on the web
 Middlesex v 1905 New Zealand scrum 
 Peter Kininmonth who scored a drop goal to propel Scotland to a famous win against Wales in 1951 
 The Middlesex side that played Somerset on 28 December 1889 at Weston-super-Mare 
 Middlesex v 1906/7 Sprinboks at Richmond (South Africa won 9–0)

References

External links
 www.middlesexrugby.com
 Middlesex Sevens
 Middlesex Sevens Profile on UR7s.com
  The First Middlesex Sevens From The Rugby History Society

Rugby union governing bodies in England
 
Sports organizations established in 1879
1879 establishments in England